The 1998 Eastern Illinois Panthers represented Eastern Illinois University as a member of the Ohio Valley Conference (OVC) during the 1998 NCAA Division I-AA football season. Led by 12th-year head coach Bob Spoo, the Panthers compiled an overall record of 6–5 and a mark of 4–3 in conference play, placing fourth in the OVC.

Schedule

References 

Eastern Illinois
Eastern Illinois Panthers football seasons
Eastern Illinois Panthers football